Cheshmeh Qanat may refer to:
 Cheshmeh Qanat, Boyer-Ahmad
 Cheshmeh Qanat, Dana